Spain competed at the inaugural edition of the Deaflympics in 1957. But they did not participate in a Deaflympics competition until 1973. Since then Spain has been regularly participating at the Deaflympics. Spain won its first Deaflympics medal way back in 1981.

Spain has competed at the Winter Deaflympics in 1985 and in 2015.

Medal tallies

Summer Deaflympics

See also 
Spain at the Paralympics
Spain at the Olympics

References 

 
Parasports in Spain
Deaf culture in Spain